Kim Ye-lim (Hangul: 김예림; born January 23, 2003) is a South Korean figure skater. She is a two-time Four Continents medalist, the 2022 NHK Trophy champion, 2022 Grand Prix de France silver medalist and the 2021 South Korean national champion. She also won two events at the Challenger Series and represented her country at the 2022 Winter Olympics.

Earlier in her career, she won two silver medals in the ISU Junior Grand Prix series (2018 JGP Lithuania, 2018 JGP Czech Republic).

Career

Early years 
Kim started skating after the 2010 Olympics, inspired by Kim Yuna.

2016–2017 season 
In August 2016, Kim debuted on the Junior Grand Prix (JGP) series in Saint-Gervais-les-Bains, France and placed fourth. In September, she placed fifth at another JGP competition in Yokohama, Japan. At JGP Japan, after Kim was unable to be located for a doping control test in a timely manner, the ISU disciplined her with a reprimand and a warning not to engage in future violations of Anti-Doping protocol. In January 2017, she won a silver medal at the South Korean senior national. She qualified to participate in the 2017 World Junior Championships, but she withdrew because of a toe injury.

2017–2018 season 
In September 2017, Kim placed fourth at the Junior Grand Prix in Minsk, Belarus. In October, Kim placed sixth at the JGP in Egna, Italy.

After the season ended, Kim changed coaches and training locations. She switched to Tom Zakrajsek and Tammy Gambill and moved to Colorado Springs, Colorado.

2018–2019 season 
In September 2018, Kim won the silver medal at the Junior Grand Prix in Kaunas, Lithuania, behind Russian figure skater Alexandra Trusova. It was her first JGP medal. The following week, Kim competed in the senior level of the 2018 CS U.S. International Classic, winning the bronze medal. She won her second silver medal at the JGP in Ostrava, Czech Republic, behind Alena Kostornaia of Russia. Her results qualified her for the Junior Grand Prix Final in Vancouver, where she finished sixth after falls in both programs.  After the free, she commented: "This first competition is, for me, like a higher level competition.  I can see many audiences, and it’s interesting, but I want to have more big competitions like this, so next time I want to show everybody my best program."

Kim placed fifth at the South Korean championships but had fared better at the previous ranking competition and was assigned to her first senior ISU Championship, the 2019 Four Continents Championship.  She finished eighth and said that she had enjoyed the experience.

2019–2020 season 

Kim left coach Tom Zakrajsek and relocated to Korea to train under her former coach. She opened her season at the 2019 CS Lombardia Trophy, placing fourth.  A week later, she won the silver medal at the 2019 CS Nebelhorn Trophy.  Assigned to one Grand Prix event, Kim placed seventh at the 2019 Skate Canada International.

In December 2019, Kim won the South Korean Trials for the 2020 Four Continents and was subsequently assigned to the event along with country mates Lim Eun-soo and You Young.  After winning the bronze medal at the South Korean championships, behind You and the senior-ineligible Lee Hae-in, she was assigned to the 2020 World Championships as well.  Kim placed sixth at Four Continents. Her World Championship debut was prevented when they were cancelled as a result of the coronavirus pandemic.

2020–2021 season 
With the pandemic greatly curtailing international opportunities for Korean skaters, Kim did not compete on either the Challenger or Grand Prix circuits and instead made her competitive debut at the 2021 South Korean Championships.  Third in the short program and second in the free skate, she won the gold medal overall, her first national title.  She was assigned to one of Korea's two ladies' berths at the 2021 World Championships in Stockholm. Kim placed fifth in the short program with a new personal best, but only thirteenth in the free skate, finishing eleventh overall. Her placement combined with that of Lee Hae-in qualified two Korean ladies' berths for the 2022 Winter Olympics in Beijing.

2021–2022 season 
Kim made her Olympic season debut at the 2021 Skate America, where she placed eighth. Her second Grand Prix was initially the 2021 Cup of China, but following its cancellation, she was reassigned to the 2021 Gran Premio d'Italia in Turin. She placed sixth at the event.

At the 2022 South Korean Championships, the final qualifying event for the South Korean Olympic team, Kim placed fourth in the short program and second in the free skate, winning the silver medal. As a result, she was named to the Olympics alongside national champion You Young. First assigned to compete at the 2022 Four Continents Championships in Tallinn, Kim won the bronze medal. She placed ahead of You and behind fellow countrywoman Lee Hae-in, achieving a new personal best for her free skate and combined total scores. She expressed satisfaction with her performance in light of the short time that had passed since the national championships. 

Competing in the women's event at the 2022 Winter Olympics, Kim placed ninth in the short program. Her history of having been reprimanded by the ISU for accidentally missing a doping test at age 13 also attracted media attention due to the perceived double standard applied by the Court of Arbitration for Sport to Russian competitor Kamila Valieva at the Games. Kim called the decision to allow Valieva to compete "regrettable." She placed eleventh in the free skate, finishing ninth overall.

Kim was assigned to finish her season at the 2022 World Championships, but had to withdraw due to a positive COVID test and was replaced by Lee.

2022–2023 season 
Kim started her season in mid-September with a win at the 2022 CS U.S. Classic, placing fifth in the short program and first in the free. This was the first time Kim had won a Challenger Series event. She went on to win the 2022 CS Finlandia Trophy as well, with the personal best scores in the free skate and in total. 

On the Grand Prix at the 2022 Grand Prix de France, Kim placed second in the short program with a clean skate. She made several mistakes in the free skate but narrowly placed second overall to win the silver medal. That was also her first medal at the Grand Prix circuit. She said afterward she was "disappointed with myself today with the performance I gave, but I am still happy and grateful I won second place." At her second assignment, the 2022 NHK Trophy in Sapporo, Kim placed first in the short program with a score of 72.22 points, unexpectedly finishing ahead of reigning World champion Kaori Sakamoto at the latter's home event. In the free skate, Kim made errors on both triple flip attempts, falling on the second, and finished second in that segment behind Sakamoto but remained first overall by 2.62 points. This was South Korea's first Grand Prix win since Kim Yu-na in 2009. Kim could only say of the victory, "I still can't believe I achieved first place, and I am so, so happy today. I think I'm going to cry!"

Kim's results qualified her for the 2022–23 Grand Prix Final, becoming the first Korean woman to achieve this feat since the earlier Kim. She finished sixth in the short program after singling her planned double Axel and having the second part of her jump combination called on a quarter. She fell once in the free skate and underrotated several other jumps but finished fifth in the segment, remaining sixth overall. Kim said that she was still satisfied to have achieved her goal of qualifying to the Final.

At the 2023 South Korean Championships, Kim won the short program narrowly over Shin Ji-a. Despite a clean skate in the free, she was overtaken in that segment by Shin, and finished with the silver medal. A few days later, Kim traveled to Lake Placid and won the bronze medal at the 2023 Winter World University Games. 

In February, Kim competed at the 2023 Four Continents Championships in Colorado Springs. With a clean skate in the short program, she finished first in the segment and won a gold small medal. She noted the high altitude of the site, saying she had been engaged in stamina training for the occasion. In the free skate, Kim underrotated a triple Lutz and doubled her planned final triple jump, a Salchow. Third in the segment, she dropped to second overall, 1.55 points behind champion Lee Hae-in. Kim admitted to being "a little disappointed in myself."

Programs

Records and achievements 

 South Korean junior ladies' record holder (short program score 69.45). Free skating and overall score broken by Lee Hae-in.
 Second South Korean junior lady to be qualified for Junior Grand Prix Final, behind Yuna Kim.

Competitive highlights
GP: Grand Prix; CS: Challenger Series; JGP: Junior Grand Prix

Detailed results

Senior level 

Small medals for short and free programs awarded only at ISU Championships. Personal bests highlighted in bold.

Junior level 

 Personal best highlighted in bold.

References

Further reading
 
 
 2016 ISU JGP St. Gervais Ladies Results
 2016 Asian Open Trophy Results
 2016 FBMA Trophy Results
 2015 Nrw Trophy Results
 2015 Asian Open Trophy Results

External links
 
  

2003 births
Living people
People from Gunpo
People from Gwacheon
South Korean female single skaters
Sportspeople from Gyeonggi Province
Figure skaters at the 2022 Winter Olympics
Olympic figure skaters of South Korea
Competitors at the 2023 Winter World University Games
Medalists at the 2023 Winter World University Games
21st-century South Korean women
Universiade medalists in figure skating
Universiade bronze medalists for South Korea
Four Continents Figure Skating Championships medalists